Lakshmi is a 1978  Indian Malayalam film, directed by J. Sasikumar and produced by E. K. Thyagarajan. The film stars Prem Nazir, Sheela, Vijayasree and Adoor Bhasi in the lead roles. The film's musical score was by G. Devarajan.

Cast
Prem Nazir as Krishnan
Sheela as Lakshmi 
Jayabharathi as Nirmala
Adoor Bhasi as Shankharanarayanan
Sankaradi as Madhavan Thamphi
Sreelatha Namboothiri as Aasha
Bahadoor as Pappu
M. G. Soman as Rajan
Meena as Meenakshi amma

Soundtrack
The music was composed by G. Devarajan and the lyrics were written by Sreekumaran Thampi.

References

External links
 

1977 films
1970s Malayalam-language films